French–Icelandic relations are foreign relations between Iceland and France. Diplomatic relations between them were established on 10 January 1946. Both nations are members of the European Economic Area, North Atlantic Treaty Organization, the Organisation for Economic Co-operation and Development and the United Nations.

History 
French seamen started fishing in the seas nearby Iceland in the 18th century. In the 1900s the French organization Société des hopitaux francais d´Islande built three hospitals in Iceland, one in Reykjavík, one in the Vestmann Islands and one in Fáskrúðsfjörður, East-Iceland. Of those three hospitals, the hospital in Fáskrúðsfjörður was rebuilt in 2009–2014. In 1955 a cemetery was built in Fáskrúðsfjörður for 49 French seamen.

Trade and investment 
In 2014, Iceland directly exported goods worth 12.7 billion ISK to France, making them the seventh export destination of Iceland.

Resident diplomatic missions 
 France has an embassy in Reykjavík.
 Iceland has an embassy in Paris.

See also 
 Ambassador of Iceland to France

References 

 

 
Iceland
Bilateral relations of Iceland